The Independent Order of Odd Fellows Hall in Ashton, Idaho, also known as the Ashton State Bank Building was built in 1907 in Early Commercial architectural style.  It served historically as a meeting hall and for businesses.  It was listed on the National Register of Historic Places in 1997.

It is built of pressed red brick on a sandstone foundation, and it has a large brick cornice capped with sandstone.  Three commercial spaces are on the first floor, with meeting room for the local Benevolent and Protective Order of Elks lodge above.  The first businesses were the Ashton State Bank, a hardware store, and a furniture store.

It is the only early building in Ashton, which developed quickly after the Oregon Short Line Railroad arrived in the Upper Snake River Valley in 1905, that retains its historic character.

References

Buildings and structures completed in 1907
Buildings and structures in Fremont County, Idaho
Buildings designated early commercial in the National Register of Historic Places
Ashton
Clubhouses on the National Register of Historic Places in Idaho
National Register of Historic Places in Fremont County, Idaho